The Dirck Gulick House is a historic house built in 1752 and located at 506 County Route 601 (Belle Mead-Blawenburg Road) in the Dutchtown section of Montgomery Township in Somerset County, New Jersey. The house was added to the National Register of Historic Places on December 11, 2003 for its significance in architecture and exploration/settlement. It is now operated as a historic house museum by the Van Harlingen Historical Society.

See also
 National Register of Historic Places listings in Somerset County, New Jersey
 List of the oldest buildings in New Jersey
 List of museums in New Jersey

References

External links
 

		
Montgomery Township, New Jersey
Houses in Somerset County, New Jersey
Stone houses in New Jersey
National Register of Historic Places in Somerset County, New Jersey
New Jersey Register of Historic Places
Historic house museums in New Jersey
Houses completed in 1752
1752 establishments in New Jersey